The Roman Catholic Diocese of Yizhou/Ichow/Linyi is a Latin suffragan diocese  in the Ecclesiastical province of the Metropolitan of Jinan in PR China.

Its episcopal seat is located in the city of Linyi, Shandong.

History 
 July 1, 1937: Established as the Apostolic Vicariate of Yizhoufu 沂州府, on territory split off from the then Apostolic Vicariate of Qingdao 青島
 Promoted on April 11, 1946 as Diocese of Yizhou 沂州, ceasing to be an exempt pre-diocesan missionary jurisdiction.

Ordinaries 
(all Roman Rite) Apostolic Vicar of Yizhoufu 沂州府 
 Charles Weber, Divine Word Missionaries (S.V.D.) (December 2, 1937 – April 11, 1946), Titular Bishop of Daldis (1937.12.02 – 1946.04.11)Suffragan Bishops of Yizhou 沂州  
 Bishop Charles Weber, (S.V.D.) (see above'' April 11, 1946 – August 7, 1970)
 Bishop John Fang Xing-yao (1997–present); also Apostolic Administrator of Yantai 煙台 (China) (2012.02.15 – ... not possessed)

Sources and external links

 GCatholic.org, with incumbent biography links
 Catholic Hierarchy

Roman Catholic dioceses in China

Christian organizations established in 1937
Roman Catholic dioceses and prelatures established in the 20th century
1937 establishments in China
Religion in Shandong
Linyi